The McAlester Public School District is a school district that competes and is classified as a 5A school district in McAlester, Oklahoma, United States.

It serves the majority of McAlester, though parts of McAlester are in other school districts.

McAlester Public Schools has a history, starting with the first high school graduating class in 1903. Graduates have gone on to achieve significant positions, such as United States Congress Speaker of the House of Representatives; Governor of Oklahoma; Oklahoma Supreme Court justice; five-star general; as well as many renowned alumni in the fields of professional athletics, art, music, business, and education. Following in their footsteps, the graduates of 2010 were awarded over $2.5 million in scholarships.

References

External links

MPS district

School districts in Oklahoma
Education in Pittsburg County, Oklahoma